Sundar Basti is a village of Kakot in the eastern part of Dolpa District in the central part of Nepal. According to the 2011 Nepal census, it had a total population of 900 people residing in 400 individual households.

References

External links 
Chapakot Municipality
District Coordination Committee Office, Syangja, Nepal

See also

Populated places in Syangja District